Tha City Paper is an American rapper, currently signed to the Ca$hville Records record label.

Early life
The City Paper grew up on the north and west side of Nashville. Around 1996–1997 while in high school, Paper was dating the cousin of a rapper named Pistol. He also knew Pistol's cousins, who were a part of a group called "PJN", which Pistol created. Marcus Fitzgerald, Tha City Paper's name, was a thriving young basketball player before joining the hip-hop scene.

Music career

Solo career
Young Paper began to frequently listen in on the group PJN recording sessions, which sparked his interest in rap. He later became a part of that group. Over time, he featured on plenty of Pistol's tracks, and gradually gained success. He has made many songs, including "City Paper (dope boy swagg)", and "Lil Bo Tuff" which were off his independent album Paper View.
In 2011 he dropped a mixtape entitled DOPaminE which was hosted by DJ Scream.

Cashville Records
After Young Buck heard Tha City Paper's mixtape DOPaminE he was quick to sign him to Ca$hville Records in early 2012. In the summer of 2012 Buck and Paper worked together on a collaboration mixtape entitled G.a.S - Gangsta and Street. This was the first project Paper released through Ca$hville Records.

Discography

Studio albums
2014: Paper View 2

Independent albums
2008: Paper View

Official mixtapes
2010: Dis What Money Do  (Hosted By: DJ Wheezy)
2011: DOPaminE (Hosted By: DJ Scream)
2014: Paper View In HD
Collaboration mixtapes
2012: G.a.S – Gangsta and Street (With: Young Buck)
2012: Welcome 2 Cashville (With: Ca$hville Records)
2013: G.a.S – Gangsta and Street 2 (With: Young Buck)
TBD: G.a.S – Gangsta and Street 3 (With: Young Buck)

Guest appearances

Awards and nominations

|-
|rowspan="1"|2008
|Young Paper
|Southern Entertainment Awards – Performance Of The Year
|
|-
|rowspan="4"|2009
|Young Paper
|Southern Entertainment Awards – Best Indie Rap Artist Of The Year
|
|-
|Young Paper
|Southern Entertainment Awards – Slept On Artist Of The Year
|
|-
|rowspan="2"|Paper View
|Southern Entertainment Awards – Indie Album Of The Year
|
|-
|Southern Entertainment Awards – Best Indie Album Of The Year
|
|-
|rowspan="3"|2011
|Tha City Paper
|Southern Entertainment Awards – Indie Rap Artist Of The Year
|
|-
|Dope Boy Swag (Produced by: Broadway)
|Southern Entertainment Awards – Beat Of The Year
|
|-
|Dope Boy Swag (Produced by: Broadway)
|Southern Entertainment Awards – Song Of The Year
|
|}

References

African-American male rappers
American male rappers
Cashville Records artists
Living people
People from Nashville, Tennessee
Rappers from Tennessee
Southern hip hop musicians
Year of birth missing (living people)
Gangsta rappers
21st-century American rappers
21st-century American male musicians
21st-century African-American musicians